Atlantis Jr. (born 1998) is the ring name of a Mexican masked professional wrestler (known as a luchador enmascarado in Spanish) who is currently working for the Mexican Consejo Mundial de Lucha Libre (CMLL) wrestling promotion, where he portrays a face (Tecnico in Spanish; those who portray the protagonists in wrestling). He made his in-ring debut in late 2017 under the name Tiburón ("Shark") but was revealed to be the son of luchador Atlantis in late 2018 when he changed his name to Atlantis Jr. and began wearing the same mask as his father. His real name is not a matter of public record, as is often the case with masked wrestlers in Mexico where their private lives are kept a secret from the wrestling fans.

Personal life
Atlantis Jr. was born in 1998, son of professional wrestler Atlantis, and older brother of El Hijo de Atlantis. With neither Atlantis nor Atlantis Jr. having been unmasked, Mexican published sources have not revealed their name as per Lucha Libre tradition. His uncle was a professional wrestler in the 1990s. Atlantis Jr. started training for a professional wrestling career at the age of 12, with the only condition set was that he had to continue to study. He was trained first by his father and later by the trainers at the Consejo Mundial de Lucha Libre (CMLL) wrestling school through the contacts of his father. At the school he was trained by Ringo Mendoza, Virus, Arkangel de la Muerte, Último Guerrero, Último Dragoncito, and Franco Columbo over the subsequent 8 years.

Professional wrestling career

Independent circuit

Tiburón (2017–2018)
In interviews Atlantis Jr. stated that he made his professional wrestling debut in 2017,  although he did not confirm if he used the ring name Tiburón (Spanish for "Shark") early on or if he worked under a different, unrevealed, identity. The first documented match for Tiburón took place on April 21, 2018 as he teamed up with Divino Boy, defeating Rokambole Jr. and Tackle as part of the Promociones Tragedias 25. Aniversario Mr. Niebla show. His highest profile match at the time was the Dragon Scramble match that was part of the 
Toryumon Mexico Dragonmania XIII show, won by Argos.

Consejo Mundial de Lucha Libre

Atlantis Jr. (2018–present)

In late 2018, Atlantis and Consejo Mundial de Lucha Libre (CMLL) officially introduced Atlantis Jr., acknowledging him previous ring name and officially giving him a mask identical to the one worn by his father. He was introduced with the nickname El Principe del Atlantis ("The Prince of Atlantis"). During his debut interview he mentioned wanting to continue the rivalry his father had with Villano III as El Hijo de Villano III ("The Son of Villano III") had begun working for CMLL shortly before Atlantis Jr. was introduced.

Atlantis Jr. made his official in-ring debut in Osaka, Japan, as part of the 2019 Fantastica Mania tour. The match saw Sansón and Okumura defeat the father/son duo, followed by them being humiliated as Sansón and Okumura stole their masks. Atlantis Jr. would get a small measure of revenge on the last day of the tour as he defeated Okumura in his first singles match.

In his first match on Mexican soil he, his father and Místico defeated Bárbaro Cavernario, Templario and El Hijo del Villano III on January 29, 2019. He worked his first major CMLL show as he, his father and Tritón defeated Los Hijos del Infierno (Ephesto, Luciferno, and Mephisto) on the undercard of the 63. Aniversario de Arena México show. While working for CMLL, Atlantis Jr. was also allowed to work on the independent circuit, which led to Atlantis Jr. and El Hijo de Octagón defeating El Hijo de L.A. Park/El Hijo de Pirata Morgan and El Canek Jr./El Hijo de Dos Caras to win the UWE Tag Team Championship on June 29, 2019.

The second-generation rivalry between the Atantis and the Villano family led to Atlantis Jr. and El Hijo del Villano III facing off in their first one-on-one match on July 5, 2019, a match that ended in a double count out as both wrestlers were fighting outside the ring for too long. During the latter half of 2019 Atlantis Jr. began working more and more matches where he did not team up with his father. For the 2019 International Gran Prix show, Atlantis Jr. teamed up with Audaz, and Flyer defeated El Hijo del Villano III, Rey Bucanero, and Tiger. This was followed by Atlantis Jr., Flyer, and Fugaz defeating Hechicero, El Hijo del Villano III, and Templario on the undercard of the 2019 Día de Muertos show.

Championships and accomplishments
Consejo Mundial de Lucha Libre
NWA World Historic Light Heavyweight Championship (1 time, current)
Mexican National Tag Team Championship  (1 time) – with Flyer
La Copa Junior (2022)
Pro Wrestling Illustrated
Ranked No. 354 of the top 500 singles wrestlers in the PWI 500 in 2021
Universal Wrestling Entertainment
UWE World Tag Team Championship (1 time, current) – with El Hijo de Octagón

Footnotes

References 

Living people
Masked wrestlers
Mexican male professional wrestlers
Unidentified wrestlers
1998 births
Professional wrestlers from Mexico City
21st-century professional wrestlers
Mexican National Tag Team Champions
NWA World Historic Light Heavyweight Champions